Apothecary is an archaic English term for a medical professional who formulates and dispenses materia medica (medicine) to physicians, surgeons, and patients. The modern terms 'pharmacist' and  'chemist' (British English) have taken over this role.  

In some languages and regions, "apothecary" is not archaic and has become those languages' term for "pharmacy" or a pharmacist who owns one. 

Apothecaries' investigation of herbal and chemical ingredients was a precursor to the modern sciences of chemistry and pharmacology.

In addition to dispensing herbs and medicine, apothecaries offered general medical advice and a range of services that are now performed by other specialist practitioners, such as surgeons and obstetricians. Apothecary shops sold ingredients and the medicines they prepared wholesale to other medical practitioners, as well as dispensing them to patients. In 17th-century England, they also controlled the trade in tobacco which was imported as a medicine.

Etymology
The term "apothecary" derives from the Ancient Greek ἀποθήκη (apothḗkē, "a repository, storehouse") via Latin apotheca ("repository, storehouse, warehouse", cf. bodega and boutique), Medieval Latin apothecarius ("storekeeper"), and eventually Old French apotecaire.

In some European and other languages, the term is current and used to designate a pharmacist/chemist, such as German and Dutch Apotheker, Latvian aptiekārs and Luxembourgish Apdikter. Likewise, "pharmacy" translates as apotek in Danish, Norwegian and Swedish, apteekki in Finnish, apoteka in Bosnian, aptieka in Latvian, апотека (apoteka) in Serbian, аптека (apteka) in Russian, Bulgarian, Macedonian and Ukrainian, Apotheke in German and apteka in Polish. The word in Indonesian is apoteker, which was borrowed from the Dutch apotheker. In Yiddish the word is אַפּטייק apteyk.

Use of the term in the names of businesses varies with time and location.  It is generally an Americanism, though some areas of the United States use it to invoke an experience of nostalgic revival and it has been used for a wide variety of businesses; while in other areas such as California its use is restricted to licensed pharmacies.

History

The profession of apothecary can be dated back at least to 2600 BC to ancient Babylon, which provides one of the earliest records of the practice of the apothecary. Clay tablets have been found with medical texts recording symptoms, prescriptions, and the directions for compounding.

In ancient India, the Sushruta Samhita, a compendium on the practice of medicine and medical formulations, has been traced back to the 1st century BC.

The Papyrus Ebers from ancient Egypt, written around 1500 BC, contain a collection of more than 800 prescriptions. It lists over 700 different drugs.

The Shen-nung pen ts'ao ching, a Chinese book on agriculture and medicinal plants (3rd century AD), is considered a foundational material for Chinese medicine and herbalism and became an important source for Chinese apothecaries. The book, which documented 365 treatments, had a focus on roots and grass. It had treatments which came from minerals, roots and grass, and animals. Many of the mentioned drugs and their uses are still followed today. Ginseng's use as a sexual stimulant and aid for erectile dysfunction stems from this book. Ma huang, an herb first mentioned in the book, led to the introduction of the drug ephedrine into modern medicine.

According to Sharif Kaf al-Ghazal, and S. Hadzovic, apothecary shops existed during the Middle Ages in Baghdad, operated by pharmacists in 754 during the Abbasid Caliphate, or Islamic Golden Age. Apothecaries were also active in Islamic Spain by the 11th century.

By the end of the 14th century, Geoffrey Chaucer (c. 1342–1400) was mentioning an English apothecary in the Canterbury Tales, specifically "The Nun's Priest's Tale" as Pertelote speaks to Chauntecleer (lines 181–184):

... and for ye shal nat tarie,
 Though in this toun is noon apothecarie,
 I shal myself to herbes techen yow,
 That shul been for youre hele and for youre prow.

In modern English, this can be translated as:

<blockquote>
... and you should not linger,Though in this town there is no apothecary, I shall teach you about herbs myself, That will be for your health and for your pride. 
</blockquote>

In Renaissance Italy, Italian Nuns became a prominent source for medicinal needs. At first they used their knowledge in non-curative uses in the convents to solidify the sanctity of religion among their sisters. As they progressed in skill they started to expand their field to create profit. This profit they used towards their charitable goals. Because of their eventual spread to urban society, these religious women gained "roles of public significance beyond the spiritual realm (Strocchia 627). Later apothecaries led by nuns were spread across the Italian peninsula.

From the 15th century to the 16th century, the apothecary gained the status of a skilled practitioner. In England, the apothecaries merited their own livery company, the Worshipful Society of Apothecaries, founded in 1617. Its roots, however, go back much earlier to the Guild of Pepperers formed in London in 1180.

However, there were ongoing tensions between apothecaries and other medical professions, as is illustrated by the publication of 'A Short View of the Frauds and Abuses Committed by Apothecaries' by the Physician Christopher Merrett in 1669 and the experiences of Susan Reeve Lyon and other women apothecaries in 17th century London. Often women (who were prohibited from entering medical school) became apothecaries which took away business from male physicians. In 1865 Elizabeth Garrett Anderson became the first woman to be licensed to practice medicine in Britain by passing the examination of the Society of Apothecaries.  By the end of the 19th century, the medical professions had taken on their current institutional form, with defined roles for physicians and surgeons, and the role of the apothecary was more narrowly conceived, as that of pharmacist (dispensing chemist in British English).

In German-speaking countries, such as Germany, Austria and Switzerland, pharmacies or chemist stores are still called apothecaries or in German Apotheken. The Apotheke ("store") is legally obligated to be run at all times by at least one Apotheker (male) or Apothekerin (female), who actually has an academic degree as a pharmacist – in German Pharmazeut (male) or Pharmazeutin (female) – and has obtained the professional title Apotheker by either working in the field for numerous years, usually by working in a pharmacy store, or taking additional exams. Thus a Pharmazeut is not always an Apotheker''. Magdalena Neff became the first woman to gain a medical qualification in Germany when she studied pharmacy at the Technical University of Karlsruhe and later passed the apothecary's examination in 1906.

Apothecaries used their own measurement system, the apothecaries' system, to provide precise weighing of small quantities. Apothecaries dispensed vials of poisons as well as medicines, and as is still the case, medicines could be either beneficial or harmful if inappropriately used. Protective methods to prevent accidental ingestion of poisons included the use of specially-shaped containers for potentially poisonous substances such as laudanum.

Apothecary work as gateway to women as healers 

Apothecary businesses were typically family-run, and wives or other women of the family worked alongside their husbands in the shops, learning the trade themselves. Women were still not allowed to train and be educated in universities so this allowed them a chance to be trained in medical knowledge and healing. Previously, women had some influence in other women's healthcare, such as serving as midwives and other feminine care in a setting that was not considered appropriate for males. Though physicians gave medical advice, they did not make medicine, so they typically sent their patients to particular independent apothecaries, who did also provide some medical advice, in particular remedies and healing.

Methods

Recipes 
Many recipes for medicines included herbs, minerals, and pieces of animals (meats, fats, skins) that were ingested, made into paste for external use, or used as aromatherapy. Some of these are similar to natural remedies used today, including catnip, chamomile, fennel, mint, garlic, and witch hazel. Many other ingredients used in the past such as urine, fecal matter, earwax, human fat, and saliva, are no longer used and are generally considered ineffective or unsanitary. Trial and error were the main source for finding successful remedies, as little was known about the chemistry of why certain treatments worked. For instance, it was known that drinking coffee could help cure headaches, but the existence and properties of caffeine itself was still a mystery.

Noted apothecaries

 Hildegard of Bingen
 Paracelsus
 James Parkinson
 Silvanus Bevan
 Hendrik Claudius
 Émile Coué
 Nicholas Culpeper
 John Keats
 Nostradamus
 John Parkinson
 Joseph Proust
 Nicholas Hughes
 Shen Nung
 Fanny Allen
 Tomé Pires

See also

 Alchemy
 Compounding
 Herb garden
 Herbalism
 Traditional Chinese medicine
 History of pharmacy
 Pharmacist
 Theriac
 Worshipful Society of Apothecaries

References

External links
 "On Keeping Shop: A Guidebook for Preparing Orders" is a book, in Arabic, from 1260 that extensively discusses the art of being an apothecary

History of pharmacy
Traditional healthcare occupations